St. Little Theresa's UP School, Karumalloor is located in Karumalloor, North Paravoor, Kerala, India. It was established in 1952 and run by CMC sisters of Mary Matha Province, Angamaly. It consists of both English and Malayalam Medium School, it has about 600 students from Pre-Primary to Class VII.

Academic achievements 
The school has been awarded "Best School Award 2012" for the overall performance by a school in the Educational Revenue District.

Activities                                                                           Guides

Park                                                                                    Daily Exercise

External links
SMC website page: sltk

Catholic schools in India
Christian schools in Kerala
Primary schools in Kerala
High schools and secondary schools in Kerala
Schools in Ernakulam district
Educational institutions established in 1952
1952 establishments in India